Savana violenta, also known as This Violent World and Mondo Violence, is a 1976 mondo film directed by Antonio Climati and Mario Morra. The film documents various scenes of graphic behavior in an attempted exposé of worldly violence. It is narrated by Giuseppe Rinaldi. It is the second collaborative feature between Antonio Climati and Mario Morra in their series of mondo films called the Savage Trilogy, following Ultime grida dalla savana.

See also
 List of Italian films of 1976

External links
 
 

Italian horror films
Mondo films
Films scored by Guido & Maurizio De Angelis
Italian documentary films
Films directed by Antonio Climati
1970s Italian films